PSAD Udayana is an Indonesian football club located in Denpasar, Bali. The team competes in Liga 3, the lowest tier of the Indonesian football league system.

Honours
 Liga 3 Bali
 Third place: 2019, 2022

References

External links 
 

Football clubs in Indonesia
Football clubs in Bali